Mark Mitchell Schultz (born September 16, 1970) is an American contemporary Christian music artist. He has been nominated for numerous Dove Awards, winning his first at the 2006 Dove Awards when the CD/DVD Mark Schultz Live: A Night of Stories & Songs was named Long Form Music Video of the Year.

Discography 

 Mark Schultz (2000)
 Song Cinema (2001)
 Stories & Songs (2003)
 Live: A Night of Stories and Songs (2005)
 Broken & Beautiful (2006)
 Come Alive (2009)
 Renaissance (2011)
 All Things Possible (2012)
 Hymns (2014)
 Before You Call Me Home -  EP (2015)
 Follow (Live) (2018)
 Christmas (2018)

Bibliography

Awards and nominations

References

External links 

 

Living people
American performers of Christian music
1970 births
Word Records artists
People from Colby, Kansas